The Danish Carbon Fund's (DCF)  Lahore Composting Facility project is the first of its kind in Pakistan. It is bringing composting technology to a country where the common practice is by open dumping of waste, as there are no landfills. This project is the first public-private partnership project in Pakistan on a large scale in the area of Municipal Solid Waste Management (MSW). 

It will contribute towards the sustainable development of the municipality of Lahore, as well as significantly reduce health hazards for the local communities. It was set up at Mehmood Booti under an agreement with the City District Government of Lahore (CDGL). The project is expected to generate over 310,000 tons of CO2e by 2018.

Reasoning behind the facility
The rapid increase of population, high rates of migration towards cities, as well as the introduction of disposable items, such as plastic bags and bottles have created serious environmental problems including: inadequate solid and liquid waste management, lack of safe water and minimal pollution control. Similar to other big cities of Pakistan, Lahore is witnessing a rapid growth in its population due to rural-urban migration from the surrounding areas and other parts of the country. Lahore has a population of around 10 million and is considered to be one of the 30 largest cities in the world. 

The increase in population has exerted immense pressure on the social and physical infrastructure of the city, leading to various socio-economic and environmental problems. Inadequate solid waste management is one of the most visible and pressing problems in the city, contributing to an unattractive environment, poor sanitation, disease, pollution of water bodies and general environmental degradation. Due to its high population growth and the lack of resources, waste management has become a challenge for the city. This project addresses the need to dispose of solid waste in economically beneficial ways without putting an extra burden on the infrastructure of Lahore city .

Addressing the lack of facilities
The country has no scientifically designed landfill and the common practice is for the open dumping of waste. LCL has leased the Mehmood Booti dumping site from CDGL as well as receiving a concession from it to process 1,000 tons per day (tpd) of MSW collected from residential areas, as well as from the city's fruit and vegetable markets. LCL has imported Belgian machinery and composting technology. LCL has created local compost management know-how through the practice of learning by doing, which did not exist previously. Composting in a scientifically designed plant will improve the local environment, reducing the health hazards created by the present practices of dumping waste in open sites. It will also sequester the emission of methane gas generated in the process of anaerobic decomposition of the bio-degradable matter. the project will also lengthen the usable life of the dump site in a city where land is running short and its costs are at a premium. The compost that is produced will be used as a soil conditioner/fertilizer for improving the quality of the soil in and around Lahore.

Addressing various issues
Declining land yields and soil erosion are big large problems in Pakistan, especially for an agriculturally based country. This is exacerbated by the fact that Pakistan has been estimated to be one of the 12 hardest hit countries by climate change, the highest impact being on agriculture and floodings. The Lahore Compost project is not only a pilot for better a MSW in the country, but also represents a potential solution for badly degraded agricultural lands. Compost application pilots are already showing positive effects in reducing land salinity, which is a big problem in Pakistan. In addition, land yields and the size of agricultural products produced have been shown to increase dramatically with the first application of compost to degraded soils. In addition to selling Certified Emission Reduction (CER), the project must also create a market for compost in the country.

Added benefits
In addition to mitigating climate change, LCL has created jobs through this project. It has implemented free vaccinations for its workers, showers where they can wash after work, introduced safety measures like the mandatory use of safety boots and gloves and it is working on creating an education program through its project. Forecast CDM revenues are expected to encourage the development of a market for compost in Pakistan, where it has not yet been operating on a larger scale. Lahore Compost will demonstrate the viability of such an initiative and encourage the private sectors participation in similar MSW projects, which will help contribute towards the sustainable development of other municipalities in Pakistan. 

Further details can be viewed on this link.

References

Agriculture in Punjab, Pakistan
Industrial composting
Lahore
Waste management in Pakistan